Char Dham National Highway, is an under construction two-lane (in each direction) express National Highway with a minimum width of 10 metres in the Indian state of Uttarakhand under Char Dham Pariyojana . The under construction highway will complement the under-construction Char Dham Railway by connecting the four holy places in Uttarakhand states namely Badrinath, Kedarnath, Gangotri and Yamunotri. The project includes 900 km national highways which will connect whole of Uttarakhand state.

Development
The total cost of ₹12,000 crores and the foundation stone of the project was laid by Prime Minister Narendra Modi on 27 December 2016 at Parade Ground in Dehradun. The highway will be called Char Dham Mahamarg (Char Dham Highway) and the highway construction project will be called as Char Dham Mahamarg Vikas Pariyojana (Char Dham Highway Development Project) and is made to improve the connectivity to the Chota Char Dham nestled in the Himalayas. Road will include several long bridges and tunnels to eliminate accident and slide prone areas. Indian Railways and National Highways Authority of India have been directed, by the Chief Secretary of India, to ensure that rail and road highway routes are integrated on this circuit.

Route alignment
Originating from Rishikesh, Char Dham highway network will have four distinct routes,

From west to east and south to north:
Rishikesh–Yamunotri
 Rishikesh
 Dharasu, NH 94, 144 km from Rishikesh
 Yamunotri, NH 94, 95 km from Dharasu. State buses go up to Hanuman Chatti (14 km from Yamunotri), taxis go all the way to Yamunotri, and lodging is available at dharamshalas and ashrams at Yamunotri.
Rishikesh–Gangotri (same route as previous one till Dharasu). This will take the railway and Char Dham road highway at Gangotri close to the  border area of Nelang Valley .
 Rishikesh
 Dharasu, NH 94, 144 km from Rishikesh
 Gangotri, NH 108, 124 km from Dharasu. Road transport goes up to Gangotri, but the actual source of Ganga is at Gomukh glacier which is another 18+ km trail and requires a minimum of two days.
Rishikesh–Kedarnath 
 Rishikesh
 Rudraprayag, NH 58, 140 km from Rishikesh
 Gaurikund (trek 12.6 km to Kedarnath on foot, by pony or helicopter ride), NH 109, 76 km from Rudraprayag, Road transport goes up to Gaurikund.
Rishikesh–Badrinath (same route are previous one till Rudraprayag). This will take the railway and Char Dham road highway at Badrinath closer to the  area of Barahoti .
 Rishikesh
 Rudraprayag, NH 58, 140 km from Rishikesh
 Joshimath
 Mana (trek to Badrinath), NH 58, 140 km from Rudraprayag, motorable all the way to Badrinath, Tapt Kund ‘hot springs’ is just before the Badrinath Temple.

Facilities
The project will have bypasses, bridges, viaducts, pit stops, parking, helipads and helicopter emergency response services, etc. along the way.

Status updates
 Dec 2016: Prime Minister Narendra Modi laid the foundation stone in December 2016.

See also 
 Char Dham Railway

References

External links
 Route map
 Route map with Uttarakhand districts
 Current functional road network before upgradation and realignment

Transport in Uttarakhand
Roads in Uttarakhand
Ring roads in India
Modi administration initiatives
Transport in Rishikesh
Proposed roads in India